Carlos III may refer to:

Charles III of Spain, King of Spain from 1759 to 1788
Royal and Distinguished Spanish Order of Carlos III, a Spanish award
Universidad Carlos III de Madrid, a Spanish university bearing his name

See also 

 Charles III (disambiguation)